Jim Courier was the defending champion but did not compete that year.

Pete Sampras won in the final 7–5, 6–0, 6–2 against Hendrik Dreekmann.

Seeds
A champion seed is indicated in bold text while text in italics indicates the round in which that seed was eliminated.

  Pete Sampras (champion)
  Goran Ivanišević (first round)
  Yevgeny Kafelnikov (semifinals)
  Boris Becker (second round)
  Thomas Enqvist (first round)
  Stefan Edberg (second round)
  Mark Philippoussis (first round)
  Michael Stich (first round)

Draw

 NB: The Final was the best of 5 sets while all other rounds were the best of 3 sets.

Final

Section 1

Section 2

References
 1996 Davidoff Swiss Indoors Draw

1996 ATP Tour
1996 Davidoff Swiss Indoors